In this list of Erik Satie's musical compositions, those series or sets comprising several pieces (e.g., Gnossienne 1, Gnossienne 2, etc.) with nothing but tempo indications to distinguish the movements by name, are generally given with the number of individual pieces simply stated in square brackets. If the pieces in a series have distinct titles, for example the 21 pieces in Sports et divertissements, all titles are given.

Many of Satie's works were not published until many years after they were composed, including a considerable number first published posthumously. This article gives the known or approximate date of composition for each work.

Piano music

Series
 Ogives [4] (1886) 
 Sarabandes [3] (1887)
 Gymnopédies [3] (1888)
 Gnossiennes [6] (1889–97)
 Danses gothiques [9] (1893)
 Pièces froides [6] (1897, two sets: Airs à faire fuir [3] and Danse de travers [3])
 Trois morceaux en forme de poire (1903, 4 hands)
 Manière de commencement
 Prolongement du même
 I
 II
 III
 En plus
 Redite
 Nouvelles pièces froides (1907)
 Sur un mur
 Sur un arbre
 Sur un pont
 Aperçus désagréables (1908, 1912, 4 hands)
 Pastorale
 Choral
 Fugue
 Deux choses (c. 1909)
 Effronterie
 Poésie
 2 Rêveries nocturnes (c. 1912, published posthumously)
Pas Vite
Très Modérément
 2 Préludes pour un chien (1912)
 Untitled (unpublished)
 Prélude canin (published posthumously)
 Préludes flasques (pour un chien) (1912)
 Voix d'intérieur
 Idylle cynique
 Chanson canine
 Avec camaraderie (originally Sous la futaille)
 Veritables Preludes flasques (pour un chien) (1912)
 Sévère réprimande
 Seul à la maison
 On joue
 Descriptions automatiques (1913)
 Sur un vaisseau
 Sur une lanterne
 Sur un casque
 Croquis et agaceries d'un gros bonhomme en bois (1913)
 Tyrolienne turque
 Danse maigre (à la manière de ces messieurs)
 Españaña
 Embryons desséchés (1913)
 d'holothurie
 d'edriophthalma
 de podophthalma
 Chapitres tournés en tous sens (1913)
 Celle qui parle trop
 Le porteur de grosses pierres
 Regrets des enfermés (Jonas et Latude)
 Vieux sequins et vieilles cuirasses (1913)
 Chez le marchand d'or (Venise XIIIe siècle)
 Danse cuirassée (Période grecque)
 La défaite des Cimbres (Cauchemar)
 Enfantines (Children's pieces):
 L'enfance de Ko-Quo (1913, first published in 1999)
 Ne bois pas ton chocolat avec tes doigts
 Ne souffle pas dans tes oreilles
 Ne mets pas ta tête sous ton bras
 3 pieces (1913, published as Trois nouvelles enfantines in 1972)
 Le vilain petit vaurien
 Berceuse
 La gentille toute petite fille
 Menus propos enfantins (1913)
 Le chant guerrier du roi des haricots
 Ce que dit la petite princesse des tulipes
 Valse du chocolat aux amandes
 Enfantillages pittoresques (1913)
 Petit prélude à la journée
 Berceuse
 Marche du grand escalier
 Peccadilles importunes (1913)
 Être jaloux de son camarade qui a une grosse tête
 Lui manger sa tartine
 Profiter de ce qu'il a des cors aux pieds pour lui prendre son cerceau
 Sports et divertissements (1914)
  Choral inappetissant
  La Balançoire
  La Chasse
  La Comédie Italienne
  Le Réveil de la Mariée
  Colin-Maillard
  La Pêche
  Le Yachting
  Le Bain de Mer
  Le Carnaval
  Le Golf
  La Pieuvre
  Les Courses
  Les Quatre-Coins
  Le Pique-nique
  Le Water-chute
  Le Tango
  Le Traîneau
  Le Flirt
  Le Feu d'artifice
  Le Tennis
 Heures séculaires et instantanées (1914)
 Obstacles venimeux
 Crépuscule matinal (de midi)
 Affolements granitiques
 Les trois valses distinguées du précieux dégoûté (1914)
 Sa taille
 Son binocle
 Ses jambes
 Avant-dernières pensées (1915)
 Idylle
 Aubade
 Méditation
 Nocturnes [5 and one unfinished] (1919)

Individual pieces
 Allegro (1884)
 Valse-ballet (1887)
 Fantaisie-valse (1887)
 Chanson hongroise (1889)
 Untitled (published posthumously as Première pensée Rose+Croix) (1891)
 Leit-motiv du "Panthée" (1891; no instrument specified)
 Fête donnée par des Chevaliers Normands en l'honneur d'une jeune demoiselle (XIe siecle) (c. 1892)
 Prélude d'Eginhard (c. 1893)
 Vexations (1893)
 Prière (1893)
 Modéré (1893, possibly part of Messe des pauvres)
 Petite ouverture à danser (1897)
 Caresse (1897)
 Aline-Polka (1899)
 Verset laïque et somptueux (1900)
 Reverie du Pauvre (1900)
 Le poisson rêveur (The Dreamy Fish, music for a tale by Lord Cheminot, alias Latour) (1901)
 Fugue-valse (1906)
 Passacaille (1906)
 Prélude en tapisserie (1906)
 Nun ruhen alle Wälder (Lutheran choral harmonised by E.Satie) (1906)
 Fâcheux exemple (1908; counterpoint exercise)
 Désespoir agréable (1908; counterpoint exercise) 
 Petite sonate (1908–9, first movement only)
 Profondeur (c.1909; minuet exercise)
 Songe-creux (c.1909; minuet exercise)
 Le prisonnier maussade (c.1909; minuet exercise)
 Le grand singe (c.1909; minuet exercise)
 San Bernardo (1913; first version of Españaña from Croquis et agaceries d'un gros bonhomme en bois, published in 2002)
 Sonatine bureaucratique (1917)
 Rag-time Parade (1917, arrangement by Hans Ourdine)
 Rêverie de l'enfance de Pantagruel (1919; arrangement of the first of Trois petites pièces montées)
 Premier Menuet (1920)

Posthumous collections
Some of Satie's early and/or unpublished works, as well as drafts and exercises, were published in the second half of the 20th century. These included (but were not limited to) the following collections:
 Musiques intimes et secrètes, three pieces from 1906 to 1913:
 Nostalgie
 Froide songerie
 Fâcheux exemple
 Six Pièces de la période, six pieces from 1906 to 1913:
 Désespoir agréable
 Both of Deux choses
 Prélude canin from 2 préludes pour un chien
 Minuet exercises: Profondeur and Songe-creux
 Carnet d'Esquisses et de Croquis, some 20 sketches and fragments from 1897 to 1914

Orchestral
 Danse, for small orchestra (1890; arranged as movement 6 of 3 Morceaux en forme de poire)
 Le Bœuf Angora (1901, unfinished; arranged for piano by Johny Fritz)
 Musique d'ameublement (1918)
 Tapisserie en fer forgé, for flute, clarinet, trumpet and strings
 Carrelage phonique, for flute, clarinet and strings
 Trois petites pièces montées (1920)
 Musique d'ameublement: tenture de cabinet préfectoral, for small orchestra (1923)

Other instrumental music
 Choses vues à droite et à gauche (sans lunettes), for violin and piano (1914)
 Choral hypocrite
 Fugue à tâtons
 Fantaisie musculaire
 Autre choral, for violin and piano (1914; unused fourth piece for Choses vues à droite et à gauche (sans lunettes))
 Embarquement pour Cythère, for violin and piano (1917; unfinished. Completed by R. Orledge)
 Marche de Cocagne, for two trumpets (1919; reused in the second of Trois petites pièces montées)
 Musique d'ameublement, 2 entr'actes or Sons industriels, for 3 clarinets, trombone and piano 4 hands (1920)
 Chez un "bistrot"
 Un salon
 Sonnerie pour réveiller le bon gros Roi des Singes, for two trumpets (1921)

Dramatic works
 Salut drapeau!, hymn for Le Prince de Byzance ("drame romanesque"), for voice(s) and/or piano/organ (1891)
 3 act-preludes for Le Fils des étoiles ("pastorale kaldéenne"), for flutes and harps (1891; later arranged for piano)
 2 preludes for Le Nazaréen ("drame ésotérique"), for piano (1892)
 Uspud ("ballet chrétien"), scored for piano, with indications for flutes, harps and strings (1892)
 Prélude de la porte héroïque du ciel ("drame ésotérique"), for piano (1894)
 Jack in the Box, three pieces for a pantomime, for piano (1899)
 Geneviève de Brabant, theatre piece for soloists, chorus and piano (c. 1900)
 Petit prélude de 'La Mort de Monsieur Mouche' (play), for piano (1900)
 Pousse l'amour (operetta) (1905–6; lost)
 Monkey dances [7] for Le Piège de Méduse ("lyric comedy"), for piano (1913)
 Les Pantins dansent ("poème dansé"), for piano or small orchestra (1913)
 Cinq grimaces pour Le songe d'une nuit d'été, incidental music for a production of Shakespeare's A Midsummer Night's Dream, for orchestra (1915)
 Parade ("ballet réaliste"), for orchestra (1916–17; additional movements 1919)
 La belle excentrique ("fantaisie sérieuse"), for orchestra or piano 4 hands (1921); some movements later arranged for solo piano; one movement based on Légende californienne)
 La statue retrouvée (divertissement), for organ and trumpet (1923)
 Scènes nouvelles [9] for Gounod's Le médecin malgré lui, for soloists and orchestra (1923)
 Mercure, ballet, for orchestra (1924)
 Relâche ("ballet instantanéiste"), for orchestra (1924)

Vocal music

Large-scale works
 Messe des pauvres, for SB chorus and organ (1893–95)
 Socrate ("drame symphonique"), for soloists and chamber orchestra or piano (1917–18)

Songs
 Elégie (1887)
 3 mélodies (1887)
 Les anges
 Les fleurs
 Sylvie
 Chanson  (1887)
 Bonjour Biqui, Bonjour! (1893)
 Chanson médiévale (1906)
 Trois poèmes d'amour (1914)
 Trois Mélodies (Satie) (1916)
 La statue de bronze
 Daphénéo
 Le chapelier
 Quatre petites mélodies (Satie) (1920)
 Elégie
 Danseuse
 Chanson
 Adieu
 Ludions (1923)
 Air du rat
 Spleen
 La grenouille américaine
 Air du poète
 Chanson du chat

Cabaret songs
 Un dîner à l'Elysée (1899)
 Le veuf (1899–1900; two versions)
 Petit recueil des fêtes (1903–04)
 Le picador est mort
 Sorcière
 Enfant-martyre
 Air fantôme
 J'avais un ami (1904)
 Les bons mouvements (1904)
 Douceur d'oublier (1904)
 Impérial-Oxford (c. 1905)
 Légende californienne (c.1905; used in La belle excentrique)
 L'omnibus automobile (1905)
 Chez le docteur (1905)
 Allons-y Chochotte (1905)
 Rambouillet (Une réception à Rambouillet) (1907; survives without lyrics)
 Les oiseaux (Il nous prêtent leurs noms) (1907; survives without lyrics)
 Marienbad (Il portait un gilet) (1907; survives without lyrics)
 Psitt! Psitt! (1907)
 La chemise (Dépaquit) (1909; three versions)

Compositions with multiple arrangements
 Trois sonneries de la Rose+Croix [3], fanfares for trumpets, harps and/or, possibly, orchestra (1892); version for solo piano (1892)
 Poudre d'or (1901): versions for orchestra and for solo piano
 Tendrement (1902): versions for voice and piano (cabaret song), for solo piano, and for orchestra
 Illusion (1902, after the song Tendrement): versions for orchestra and for solo piano
 Je te veux (published 1903): versions for voice and piano (cabaret song), for solo piano, and for orchestra
 La Diva de l'Empire (1904): versions for voice and piano (cabaret song), for solo piano (as Intermezzo américain, arrangement by H. Ourdine), and for orchestra
 Le Piccadilly (1904): versions for piano and strings, and for solo piano
 En habit de cheval (1911): versions for piano 4 hands and for orchestra
 Choral
 Fugue litanique
 Autre choral
 Fugue de papier
 L'aurore aux doigts de rose (1916): versions for orchestra and for piano 4 hands
 Trois petites pièces montées (1920): originally for orchestra; reduction for piano 4 hands published in 1920, orchestral score published in 1921

Notes

References

External links
 
 

 
Satie